Evan Thomas Porter (born March 13, 1987) is an American baseball coach and former second baseman and shortstop, who is the current head baseball coach of the Omaha Mavericks. He played college baseball at Omaha for coach Bob Herold from 2005 to 2009 before playing professional baseball for 4 season from 2009 to 2012. He returned to Omaha in 2013 as an assistant.

Amateur career
Porter attended Millard North High School in Omaha, Nebraska, where he was a teammate of Conor Gillaspie. Porter then enrolled at the University of Nebraska Omaha, to play college baseball for the Omaha Mavericks baseball team.

As a freshman at the University of Nebraska Omaha in 2006, Porter had a .338 batting average, a .381 on-base percentage (OBP) and a .510 SLG.

As a sophomore in 2007, Porter batted .336 with a .574 SLG, 12 home run, and 61 RBIs.

In the 2008 season as a junior, Porter hit 15 home runs, 18 doubles, and 76 RBIs.

Porter had his best season as a senior in 2009, leading the team in doubles (23), home runs (10), RBIs (62), batting average (.424) and slugging (.655).

Professional career
Porter was drafted in the 23rd round of the 2009 Major League Baseball draft by the Philadelphia Phillies.

Porter signed with the Solingen Alligators on April 14, 2010. Porter spent the 2011 and 2012 seasons with the Gothenburg Sharks and the Victoria Park Reds.

Porter signed with SV ADO for the 2012 season.

Coaching career
Porter returned to the United States in 2013 as an assistant coach at Omaha. He remained an assistant through the 2016 season. When the University parted ways with Bob Herold as head coach, Porter was named the interim head coach. After winning just 27 games in his first two seasons as head coach, Porter's 2019 team was projected to finish 5th in the Summit League, but the Mavericks won both the Summit League regular season and Tournament on route to their first ever NCAA Division I Baseball Tournament appearance.

Head coaching record

See also
 List of current NCAA Division I baseball coaches

References

External links

Omaha Mavericks bio

Living people
1987 births
Baseball second basemen
Baseball shortstops
Omaha Mavericks baseball players
Williamsport Crosscutters players
Omaha Mavericks baseball coaches
Sportspeople from Omaha, Nebraska
American expatriate baseball players in the Netherlands
American expatriate baseball players in Germany
Baseball coaches from Nebraska
Baseball players from Nebraska